Špiro is a masculine given name found in Montenegro and Croatia.

It may refer to:

 Špiro Grubišić (1904–1985), Croatian rower
  (1933–2020), Croatian and Yugoslav actor
 Špiro Kulišić (1908–1989), Montenegrin ethnologist
  (1904–1942), Montenegrin Yugoslav Partisan
 Špiro Peričić (born 1993), Croatian football player

See also
 Špirić

Croatian masculine given names
Montenegrin masculine given names